The list of ship launches in 1928 includes a chronological list of some ships launched in 1928.


References 

Sources

1928
Ship launches